1st Viscount Hampden may refer to:

Robert Hampden-Trevor, 1st Viscount Hampden, 4th Baron Trevor (1706–1783)
Henry Bouverie William Brand, 1st Viscount Hampden (1814–1892)

See also
Viscount Hampden